Heiderose Berroth (2 June 1947 – 13 September 2022) was a German politician. A member of the Free Democratic Party, she served in the Landtag of Baden-Württemberg from 1996 to 2011.

Berroth died on 13 September 2022, at the age of 75.

References

1947 births
2022 deaths
20th-century German politicians
20th-century German women politicians
21st-century German politicians
21st-century German women politicians
Members of the Landtag of Baden-Württemberg
Free Democratic Party (Germany) politicians
University of Stuttgart alumni
University of Würzburg alumni
Politicians from Stuttgart